O'Halloran Hill Recreation Park is a protected area located about  south  of the Adelaide city centre in the suburbs of Seaview Downs and O’Halloran Hill.  it is in the process of becoming part of the new Glenthorne National Park–Ityamaiitpinna Yarta.

History
The recreation park was proclaimed under the National Parks and Wildlife Act 1972 in 1989 for "recreation and nature conservation purposes" in respect to parcels of land acquired by the Government of South Australia starting in the 1970s for three purposes - creation of "an open space buffer", provision of "both visual amenity and recreational opportunities for the rapidly growing southern suburbs" and the creation of "a second ring of parklands around Adelaide that would cater for outdoor pursuits, as well as protecting the Hills Face Zone from development".

The new Glenthorne National Park–Ityamaiitpinna Yarta opened to the public in November 2020, and the recreation park is in the process of transitioning to become part of it.

Description
The recreation park is classified as an IUCN Category III protected area.

See also
 List of protected areas in Adelaide

References

External links
O'Halloran Hill Recreation Park official webpage
O'Halloran Hill Recreation Park webpage on protected planet

Recreation Parks of South Australia
Protected areas in Adelaide
Protected areas established in 1989
1989 establishments in Australia